"Free Uzi" is a song by American rapper Lil Uzi Vert and was released on March 28, 2019. According to iTunes, the song was released solely under Lil Uzi Vert's name.

Background
Shortly after teasing their second album Eternal Atake, Uzi announced their retirement from music on January 11, 2019. They also stated that they had already deleted the whole album. On March 25, 2019, it was reported that they returned to the studio to record new music. Various news sources reported involvement from Jay Z's label Roc Nation. "Free Uzi" was released three days later. 
Almost a day later, the song was removed from all streaming services due to an uncleared sample of G Herbo's 2012 song, "Gangway". Lil Uzi Vert's label claimed that it was not released legitimately, but rather a "leaked song".

Music video
The song's accompanying music video was released alongside the song's official release and was directed by Qasquiat.

References

2019 singles
2019 songs
Lil Uzi Vert songs
Songs written by Lil Uzi Vert
Trap music songs